Aurel Guga (10 August 1898 – 7 November 1936) was a Romanian football player. Regarded as one of the most talented and versatile players of the early 1920s, Guga was the first captain of the Romania football team. He was also part of Romania's squad for the football tournament at the 1924 Summer Olympics.

Early life
Born in Temeskubin (Cuvin) in what is now Serbia on 10 August 1898, with other sources claiming that he was born in 1900, Guga finished high school in Oravița, before moving to Lugoj. Because of World War I he could not start playing football until 1919, when he was 21. He started at the local club, Vulturii Lugoj, but stayed only one year because he wanted to apply for the Commercial Academy from Cluj.

Career
After his arrival in Cluj, he joined U Cluj, a club formed one year earlier by the "Sports Society of University Students". At the time, he only played with his team in local competitions since there was not any football championship at a national level. In January 1922, a Viennese newspaper dedicated a full-page article to him, calling him "an exceptional forward player".

Sometime in October or November 1923, U Cluj got to play its first tournament abroad, at the invitation of the Grenoble municipality for the opening of their new stadium. U Cluj first played in Lyon, with a local team, managing to win with 5–2; Aurel Guga scored three times. The next day, the French press wrote that "he is a world-class player". Since there were rumors at the times about a friendly between the England national team and a team of selected players from the continent, Guga was proposed by the French to play for Europe. In Grenoble, U Cluj beat the French, winning with 3–0, with Guga scoring twice.

After he graduated from college in 1925, the press wrote that "the excellent international Romanian player will settle in Timișoara, very likely signing with one of the local teams." However, there are no official documents to confirm that he actually played for Timișoara. Instead, in November, he started playing for Gloria CFR Arad, helping his team finishing second in the Regional Championship. Sometime in March 1926, he joined UCAS Petroşani, the vice-champion team at the time, but retired from all the competitions that season. From 1927 he had a two-year spell in Lupeni, playing for local Jiul, and in 1929, he returned in Cluj, to play for the last time for the club that made him famous. In 1930, he was officially retired.

On 8 November 1936, Gazeta Sporturilor reported that the day before, Guga was involved in a car accident. He lost control of his car, fell into the Bega Channel, and drowned.

As Ioan Chirilă recalls in his book:
Guga was one of the finest players our land ever gave. And maybe the most complete. And the most modern.

International career
Aurel Guga captained the first official match of the Romania national team in the 1922 King Alexander's Cup, against Yugoslavia, a match won by the Romanian team with Guga scoring the winning goal. He played six years for Romania, managing twelve caps and four goals. He also captained nine out of twelve matches.

Scores and results table. Romania's goal tally first:

Death
He died on 7 November 1936 at age 38, while driving his car in Timișoara and falling in the Bega river, where he drowned.

References

External links

1898 births
1936 deaths
People from Kovin
Romanian footballers
Romania international footballers
Olympic footballers of Romania
Footballers at the 1924 Summer Olympics
Liga I players
CSM Lugoj players
FC Universitatea Cluj players
CS Gloria Arad players
CSM Jiul Petroșani players
CS Minerul Lupeni players
Road incident deaths in Romania
Association football forwards